Sibir (literally: Siberia) is a Russian Project 22220 nuclear-powered icebreaker. Built by Baltic Shipyard in Saint Petersburg, the vessel was laid down in 2015, launched in 2017, and delivered in December 2021.

Development and construction

Background 

In the late 1980s, the Russian research institutes and design bureaus developed a successor for the 1970s Arktika-class nuclear-powered icebreakers as part of a wider icebreaker fleet renewal program initiated shortly after the dissolution of the Soviet Union. The new 60-megawatt icebreaker, referred to using a type size series designation LK-60Ya, would feature a so-called dual-draft functionality which would allow the vessel to operate in shallow coastal areas after de-ballasting. Although the preliminary designs had been developed almost two decades earlier, the LK-60Ya design was finalized in 2009 as Project 22220 by Central Design Bureau "Iceberg" and the construction of the first vessel was awarded to Saint Petersburg-based Baltic Shipyard in August 2012. Two additional contracts in May 2014 and August 2019 have increased the number of Project 22220 icebreakers under construction or on order to five. , Russian government reportedly plans to allocate 118 billion rubles for the construction of two additional Project 22220 icebreakers that would be delivered in 2028 and 2029.

Construction 

The tender for construction of two additional Project 22220 nuclear-powered icebreakers, referred to as the first and second serial vessels of the project, was announced at the keel laying ceremony of the lead ship Arktika on 5 November 2013. On 8 May 2014, the 84.4 billion ruble (about US$2.4 billion) contract for two vessels was awarded to the Saint Petersburg -based Baltic Shipyard, the only company whose bid had been accepted.

The keel of the second Project 22220 icebreaker was laid on 26 May 2015. The icebreaker was launched as Sibir, Russian for Siberia, on 22 September 2017. Previously, the name had been used on the second Arktika-class icebreaker that was in service in 1977–1992.

Initially, the delivery of the second Project 22220 nuclear-powered icebreaker was scheduled for 2018, but this had to be postponed due to problems with the delivery of the steam turbines from a domestic manufacturer.

Sibir left for first sea trials on 16 November 2021 and returned to Saint Petersburg on 30 November. The second sea trials were completed in December 2021. While some minor malfunctions were discovered, the icebreaker was delivered to Atomflot on 24 December 2021.

Career 
Sibir left Saint Petersburg on 13 January 2022 and, after a flag-raising ceremony in Murmansk on 25 January 2022, headed to the Kara Sea and Gulf of Ob to escort ships through the ice.

Design 

Sibir has a nuclear-turbo-electric powertrain. The onboard nuclear power plant consists of two 175 RITM-200 pressurized water reactors fueled by up to 20% enriched Uranium-235 and two 36 turbogenerators. The propulsion system follows the classic polar icebreaker pattern with three  four-bladed propellers driven by  electric motors.

Notes

References 

Project 22220 icebreakers
2017 ships